East Carroll Parish School Board is a school district headquartered in Lake Providence, Louisiana, United States. The districts serves East Carroll Parish.

In the 2012–2013 school year, East Carroll Parish public schools had the third highest rate of improvement statewide in the annual end-of-course examinations administered in Algebra I and English II.

School uniforms
The district requires all students in grades Kindergarten through 8 to wear school uniforms.

Schools

High schools
 General Trass High School (Lake Providence)

Junior high schools
 Griffin Middle Academy (Lake Providence)

Primary schools
 Southside Elementary School (Lake Providence)

References

External links
 East Carroll Parish School Board

School districts in Louisiana
School Board